Arthur Torrane Urquhart (1839–1919) was an arachnologist and naturalist based in New Zealand.

Biography 

Urquhart was born in Switzerland in 1839. In 1856, he migrated to New Zealand and lived in a farm in Karaka. He produced eighteen taxonomic papers between 1882 and 1897.

References 

1839 births
1919 deaths
New Zealand arachnologists